Zator may refer to:

People
 Dominick Zator (born 1994), Canadian football player

Places
 Gmina Zator, Lesser Poland Voivodeship, Poland
 Zator, Lesser Poland Voivodeship, Poland
 Zator, Masovian Voivodeship, Poland
 Zátor, Czech Republic

Other
 Duchy of Zator
 Zator Plus, brand name of Spironolactone
 Zator (retrieval system), a historical information retrieval system